Mariano Clemente (born in Buenos Aires, Argentina) is an Argentine footballer who played for Clubs of Argentina and Chile.

Teams
  Sportivo Belgrano 2004–2005
  Juventud Unida 2005–2006
  Sportivo Belgrano 2006–2008
  Deportes Puerto Montt 2009–present

References
 

Living people
Argentine footballers
Argentine expatriate footballers
Puerto Montt footballers
Primera B de Chile players
Expatriate footballers in Chile
Association footballers not categorized by position
Year of birth missing (living people)
Footballers from Buenos Aires